Héctor González is the name of:
Héctor González (Venezuelan footballer) (born 1977), Venezuelan football midfielder
Héctor González Baeza (born 1986), Spanish cyclist
Héctor González (footballer, 1937-2015), Colombian football forward
Héctor González (footballer, born 1972), Ecuadorian football midfielder
Héctor González González (1882–1948), Mexican lawyer, politician, writer, journalist, and intellectual
Hector Gonzalez (judge), (born 1964), American lawyer who is a United States district judge of the United States District Court for the Eastern District of New York.